John Forster (1668 – 2 July 1720) was an Irish lawyer, politician and judge.

Background
Forster was born in Dublin, one of four children of Richard Forster and his wife Anne Webber. His father sat in the Irish House of Commons for Swords and came from a family long associated with the Dublin business community. Nicholas Forster, Bishop of Raphoe, was his brother.

Career
Forster served as Recorder of  Dublin from 1701 to 1714, and represented Dublin City in the Irish House of Commons from 1703 to 1715. He was Solicitor-General for Ireland in 1709 and Attorney-General for Ireland from Christmas Eve 1709 to 1711, before being raised to the Bench as Chief Justice of the Irish Common Pleas on 20 September 1714.

In 1713 he took part in the hotly contested Irish General Election and his constituency was the scene of the Dublin election riot.

Elrington Ball described Forster as "a sound lawyer and impressive speaker" but lacking in political judgment. Like Alan Brodrick, 1st Viscount Midleton, his mentor, he was stubborn and hot-tempered. His tenure as Recorder of Dublin saw a major conflict between the aldermen of Dublin and the Privy Council; Forster was entirely on the side of the aldermen, and for this, he was violently attacked by Jonathan Swift and other critics. These attacks undoubtedly took their toll, and it is believed he exchanged the Recordership for the position of Chief Justice in the belief that the more senior position would, in practice, be less onerous than the Recordership.

Family
Forster married firstly Rebecca Monck, daughter of Henry Monck of St. Stephens Green, Dublin and his wife Sarah, daughter and heiress of Sir Thomas Stanley of Grangegorman, by whom he had at least three children, Richard, Anne and Elizabeth.

He married secondly Dorothy Evans, daughter of George Evans and Mary Eyre, and sister of George Evans, 1st Baron Carbery. They had a daughter, Dorothy.

His son Richard married Elizabeth Geering in 1721, and died in 1738.  His daughter Anne married the celebrated philosopher George Berkeley, Bishop of Cloyne; her sister Elizabeth married Rev. Robert Spence. The youngest child Dorothy married Thomas Burton: they were the grandparents of another leading judge, Thomas Burton Vandeleur.

He died following a stroke at his home, Clonshagh, Santry.

References

1667 births
1720 deaths
Attorneys-General for Ireland
17th-century Irish lawyers
Irish MPs 1703–1713
Irish MPs 1713–1714
Irish MPs 1715–1727
Members of the Parliament of Ireland (pre-1801) for County Dublin constituencies
Solicitors-General for Ireland
Speakers of the Parliament of Ireland (pre-1801)
Members of the Privy Council of Ireland
Chief Justices of the Irish Common Pleas
Recorders of Dublin
18th-century Irish judges